Eucyclotoma varicifera is a species of sea snail, a marine gastropod mollusk in the family Raphitomidae.

Description
The length of the shell attains 17 mm, its diameter 5 mm.

(Original description) The elongate shell is straightly acuminate, rather light and thin. It is decussated by longitudinal and transverse ridges. It contains six, flatly convex whorls, furnished here and there with somewhat indistinct varices. The aperture is wide. The siphonal canal is short. The color of the shell is white, stained with reddish brown.

Distribution
This marine species occurs off Paumotus, Polynesia.

References

External links
 

varicifera
Gastropods described in 1868